Grahame Edward Corling (born 13 July 1941) is a former Australian cricketer who played in five Test matches in 1964. He took 12 wickets, including that of Geoffrey Boycott in his debut innings.

Grahame grew up in Waratah, New South Wales, and honed his cricketing skills playing for Waratah-Mayfield District Cricket Club.

References

1941 births
Living people
Australia Test cricketers
New South Wales cricketers
International Cavaliers cricketers
Australian cricketers
People from Newcastle, New South Wales
Cricketers from New South Wales